The 1985 NCAA Women's Soccer Tournament was the fourth annual single-elimination tournament to determine the national champion of NCAA women's collegiate soccer. The championship game was played at George Mason Stadium in Fairfax, Virginia during November 1985.

George Mason defeated defending champion North Carolina in the final, 2–0, to win its first national title. The Patriots were coached by Hank Leung. This would be the last championship until 1995 not won by North Carolina.

The most outstanding player was Pam Baughman (George Mason) and the most outstanding defensive player was Betsy Drambour (George Mason). An All-Tournament team was not named this year. 

The leading scorer for the tournament was Lisa Gmitter from George Mason (3 goals).

Qualification
At the time, there was only one NCAA championship for women's soccer; a Division III title was added in 1986 and a Division II title in 1988. Hence, all NCAA women's soccer programs  (whether from Division I, Division II, or Division III) were eligible for this championship. The tournament field remained set at 14 teams this year even though the third-place match was discontinued.

Bracket

See also 
 NCAA Division I women's soccer championship
 1985 NCAA Division I Men's Soccer Championship

References

NCAA
NCAA Women's Soccer Championship
 
NCAA Women's Soccer Tournament
Women's sports in Virginia